Japji Sahib 
() is the Sikh thesis, that appears at the beginning of the Guru Granth Sahib – the scripture of the Sikhs. It was composed by Guru Angad, and is mostly the writings of Guru Nanak. It begins with Mool Mantra and then follow 38 paudis (stanzas) and completed with a final Salok by Guru Angad at the end of this composition. The 38 stanzas are in different poetic meters.

Japji Sahib is the first composition of Guru Nanak, and is considered the comprehensive essence of Sikhism.  Expansion and elaboration of Japji Sahib is the entire Guru Granth Sahib. It is first Bani in Nitnem. Notable is Nanak's discourse on 'what is true worship' and what is the nature of God'. According to Christopher Shackle, it is designed for "individual meditative recitation" and as the first item of daily devotional prayer for the devout. It is a chant found in the morning and evening prayers in Sikh gurdwaras. It is also chanted in the Sikh tradition at the Khalsa initiation ceremony and during the cremation ceremony.

Related to Japji Sahib is the Jaap Sahib, the latter is found at the start of Dasam Granth and was composed by Guru Gobind Singh.

Etymology
Japa (Sanskrit: जप) means the recitation of a mantra. The Sanskrit word japa is derived from the root jap-, meaning "to utter in a low voice, repeat internally, mutter".

Following are some accepted meanings of Jap:
 A conventional meaning for Jap(u) is to recite, to repeat, or to chant. 
 Jap also means to understand. Gurbani cites Aisa Giaan Japo Man Mere, Hovo Chakar Sache Kere, where the word Jap means to understand wisdom.

Content

The Japji Sahib’s first stanza or pauri states that one cannot be cleaned or stay clean by repeatedly taking bath at holy sites as the thoughts are not clean, by silence alone one cannot find peace as the thoughts come one after another in our mind, by food and all material gains alone one cannot satisfy one's hunger, to be purified one must abide in love of the divine. Hymn 2 asserts that by God's command the ups and downs in life happen, it is He who causes suffering and happiness, it is He whose command brings release from rebirth, and it is His command by which one lives in perpetual cycles of rebirth from karma.

With good karmas in past life and his grace is the gate to mukti (liberation); in him is everything, states verse 4. The verse 5 states that He has endless virtues, so one must sing His name, listen, and keep the love for Him in one's heart. The Guru's shabda (word) is the protecting sound and wisdom of the Vedas, the Guru is Shiva, Vishnu (Gorakh) and Brahma, and the Guru is mother Parvati and Lakshmi. All living beings abide in Him. Verse 6 to 15 describe the value of listening to the word and having faith, for it is the faith that liberates. God is formless and indescribable, state verses 16 to 19. It is remembering His name that cleanses, liberates states Hymn 20. Hymns 21 through 27 revere the nature and name of God, stating that man's life is like a river that does not know the vastness of ocean it journeys to join, that all literature from Vedas to Puranas speak of Him, Brahma speaks, Siddhas speak, Yogi speaks, Shiva speaks, the silent sages speak, the Buddha speaks, the Krishna speaks, the humble Sewadars speak, yet one cannot describe Him completely with all the words in the world.

Verse 30 states that He watches all, but none can see Him. God is the primal one, the pure light, without beginning, without end, the never changing constant, states Hymn 31.

Japji Sahib and Jaap Sahib

The Guru Granth Sahib starts with Japji Sahib, while Dasam Granth starts with Jaap Sahib. Guru Nanak is credited with the former, while Guru Gobind Singh is credited with the latter. Jaap Sahib is structured as a stotra that are commonly found in 1st millennium CE Hindu literature. The Jaap Sahib, unlike the Japji Sahib, is composed predominantly in Braj-Hindi and the Sanskrit language, with a few Arabic and Persian words, and with 199 stanzas making it longer than Japji Sahib. The Jaap Sahib is, like Japji Sahib, in praise of God as the unchanging, loving, unborn, ultimate power and includes within it 950 names of God, starting with Brahma, Shiva, Vishnu and moving on to over 900 names and avatars of gods and goddesses found in Hindu traditions, with the assertion that these are all manifestations of the One, the limitless eternal creator. This is similar to Sahasranama texts of India, and for this reason this part is also called as Akal Sahasranama. The text includes Arabic and Persian words for God such as Khuda and Allah. The Japu Sahib includes a mention of God as wielder of weapons, consistent with the martial spirit of Dasam Granth.

Gallery

References 

Adi Granth
Sikh scripture
Guru Nanak Dev